Elections to Wigan Borough Council were held on 4 May 2000. One-third of the council was up for election, as well as an extra vacancy in Norley - both of which were uncontested. Since the election, there had been a by-election in which the Liberal Democrats gained the seat being fought in Hindsford from Labour.

The previous year had seen a peak in candidates contesting, but with the absence of the Greens, who had fielded a full slate last time around, candidates returned to a normal level. Some of those who'd stood for the Greens decided to run on an independent list, covering a quarter of the wards. There were a further handful of Independent candidates elsewhere, including the return of John Vickers in Hindley Green after an eight-year absence, and a second attempt of Jack Sumner in Leigh East, to produce the highest number of Independents contesting since 1973. The Conservatives fielded their highest amount, at 21, since 1982, and the Lib Dems - whilst still much reduced from their Alliance years - produced a stronger showing than recent years of ten candidates. Labour, as usual, contested every seat.

Turnout followed recent trends, at a slightly improved 19.5%, although the three wards that trailed postal voting seen marked increases. Similarities ended there, as the Conservatives seen a dramatic recovery in their fortunes, with their voter share rising to the highest since 1980, and their vote near double recent years figures. Labour, in turn, suffered double-digit swings against them in most wards, with a sharp fall in their vote share to pre-peak levels and their lowest vote figure since the council's inception, narrowly surpassing the previous figure set in 1975. The Lib Dems seen another year of modest improvement in their vote, and the two returning Independents, as well as a third in Hindley garnered large swings towards them.

In all, there were two gains on the night, with Labour gaining in Beech Hill to return it to full Labour representation after a decade of Lib Dem inroads, and a loss to the Conservatives who won back representation on the council by way of their first win in Orrell since 1982. The Lib Dems narrowly held onto their newly won seat in Hindsford, with a 56-vote majority.

Election result

This result had the following consequences for the total number of seats on the Council after the elections:

Ward results

By-elections between 2000 and 2002

References

2000 English local elections
2000
2000s in Greater Manchester